Love is a 1919 American short comedy film directed by and starring Fatty Arbuckle. Prints of the film survive in collections.

Plot
As summarized in a magazine, Fatty (Arbuckle) meets Winnie (Westover) after rescuing her father Frank (Hayes) from a well at their farm and is smitten with her. Fatty is dismissed and leaves, however, as Frank wants Winnie to marry Al Clove (St. John). Fatty returns to the farm in the disguise of a hired girl so that he can be near his beloved, but finds he must fend off the flirtations of her father Frank. Winnie's marriage is all arranged, but at the dress rehearsal the groom is missing, so the "hired girl" takes his place and goes through the practice ceremony, word for word, with the bride. When the wedding day arrives, the ceremony is broken up when Fatty and Winnie announce that they have already been married as the rehearsal was the real thing.

Cast
 Roscoe 'Fatty' Arbuckle as Fatty
 Al St. John as Al Clove, Fatty's rival
 Winifred Westover as Winnie
 Frank Hayes as Frank, Winnie's father
 Monty Banks as Farmhand (as Mario Bianchi)
 Kate Price as the Cook

See also
 Fatty Arbuckle filmography

References

External links

 

1919 films
Films directed by Roscoe Arbuckle
1919 comedy films
1919 short films
American silent short films
American black-and-white films
Silent American comedy films
Films with screenplays by Roscoe Arbuckle
Films produced by Joseph M. Schenck
American comedy short films
1910s American films